Bryce McCall (born August 4, 1988, in Regina, Saskatchewan) is a Canadian football defensive back most recently for the Saskatchewan Roughriders of the Canadian Football League. After the 2011 CIS season, he was ranked as the eighth best player in the Canadian Football League's Amateur Scouting Bureau January rankings for players eligible in the 2012 CFL Draft, and fifth by players in Canadian Interuniversity Sport. He played CIS football with the Saskatchewan Huskies and in the CJFL with the Regina Thunder. He signed with the Roughriders as a free agent on December 19, 2012.

References

1988 births
Living people
Players of Canadian football from Saskatchewan
Canadian football defensive backs
Saskatchewan Huskies football players
Saskatchewan Roughriders players
Sportspeople from Regina, Saskatchewan